Stuart "Stu" Mead is an American artist who lives and works in Berlin, Germany.

Work

In April, 2004 a group exhibition called "When Love Turns to Poison" was held at the Kunstraum Bethanien in Berlin, showing, among other works by Mead, the painting "First Communion," which was destroyed during the exhibition by a religion-obsessed vandal. The exhibition of eight artists became a national scandal, with conservative newspapers declaring it pornographic and non-art.
Controversy also developed around an exhibition of Mead's work at Hyaena Gallery in Burbank, California in 2008, when four artists associated with the gallery left it in protest against Mead's exhibition.
In 2009 Mead participated in the exhibition loop "Öffentliche Erregung" (Public Arousal), at loop – raum für aktuelle kunst Berlin, Germany Berlin, Germany Group exhibition that dealt specifically with the gray zone where art approaches the pornographic.
In 2010 Mead's work was included in a large exhibition at Villa Merkel/Bahnwarterhaus in Esslingen, Germany called "Family Jewels", in which artist Damien Deroubaix presented a family tree of the artists who have influenced his work.

Exhibitions (selection)
 2020  E2/Sterput, "Nympha Stumeadiana", Brussels, Belgium
 2014  MOHS exhibit, "Stu Mead: Road to Hell", Copenhagen, Denmark
 2013 Galerie Crystal Ball,  "Monster Girls", Berlin, Germany
 2012 Galerie Toxic, "Order-Chaos", Luxembourg, Luxembourg
 2012  Taco-che, "Fente Asia", Tokyo, Japan
 2011  Märkisches Museum Witten, "das widerspenstige Fleisch" (Rudolf Schlichter), Witten, Germany
 2010  Villa Merkel/Bahnwarterhaus, "Family Jewels", Esslingen, Germany
 2010  Aeroplastics contemporary,"Alchemy of Delusion", Brussels, Belgium
 2009  The Horse Hospital, "The Impossible World of Stu Mead", London, England
 2009  loop – raum für aktuelle kunst,"Öffentliche Erregung", Berlin, Germany
 2008  Bongout Gallery, "Mollusk Kollektiv", Berlin
 2006  Institut de Cultura La Capella, "BerlinTendenzen", Barcelona, Spain
 2005  Vanilla Gallery,  Tokyo, Japan
 2004  Kunstraum Kreuzberg/Bethanien, "When Love Turns to Poison", Berlin, Germany
 2003 endart, "Stu Mead", Berlin, Germany
 2003 Un Regard Moderne, "Stu Mead", Paris, France
 2003 Emily Tsingou Gallery,"Please Don't Make Me Cry", Curated by Georgina Starr, London, England
 2003  Track 16 Gallery,"Le Dernier Cri: Legendary Publishers of the International Underground", Los Angeles, California, USA
 1999 Kiehle Gallery, St. Cloud State University, "Stu Mead", St. Cloud, Minnesota, USA

Publications
 The Immortal MAN BAG Journal of Art (with Frank Gaard), Le Dernier Cri, 1999
 Miniput,  Le Dernier Cri, 2003
 Devil's Milk,  Le Dernier Cri, 2005
 Krampussy, Le Dernier Cri, 2008
 Men beg (with Frank Gaard), Le Dernier Cri, 2011
 Fentasia,  Le Dernier Cri, 2012
 Nympha Stumeadiana (with a text by Déline Luca),  E2, 2020

References

External links
 
 NO! Art memo about Stu Mead
 Apocalypse Culture II uncensored
 1997 interview with Steven Cerio originally published in Seconds magazine

20th-century American painters
American male painters
21st-century American painters
People from Iowa
1955 births
Living people
American expatriates in Germany
20th-century American male artists